Göhler is a German surname. Notable people with the surname include: 

Allison Göhler (born 1984), Chilean meteorologist
Antje Göhler (born 1967), German chess master and writer
Christa Göhler (1935–2010), German cross-country skier
Nico Göhler (born 2003), German racing driver
Roland Göhler (born 1943),  German rower

See also
Goler (disambiguation)

German-language surnames